Olivia Palermo (born February 28, 1986) is an American socialite, fashion influencer, entrepreneur, model and television personality. Palermo gained celebrity status when she sued socialiterank.com for releasing a letter that was proven to be false. It made a news story on New York Magazine on May 4, 2007.

Early life 
Olivia Palermo was born on February 28, 1986, in New York City and grew up on the Upper East Side and in Greenwich, Connecticut. Her father is a real estate developer and her mother is an interior designer. She has a younger brother, Grant. Palermo attended elementary school at Nightingale-Bamford School in Manhattan and high school at the St. Luke's School in New Canaan, Connecticut. She attended the American University of Paris and The New School. She is of Italian descent. Palermo grew up with a learning disability. Palermo interned at Quest magazine. Photographer Patrick McMullan spotted her at an auction, then took pictures of her about town. Palermo began taking part in the charity event circuit in New York, becoming a member of the Friends Committee of New Yorkers For Children and joining the committee of Operation Smile.

Career
Palermo began her career as part of MTV's television show, The City. The series aired for two seasons from 2008 until 2010, and focused on the personal and professional lives of several young women residing in New York City. As part of the show, Palermo worked for Diane von Fürstenberg and later in the accessories department for Elle magazine.

In 2009, Palermo signed with the talent agency Wilhelmina International Inc. to focus full-time on development of her brand. She became a guest editor for the Gap's now-defunct Piperlime.com in 2011 and appeared as a guest judge on Project Runway Season 9. In 2010, Palermo modeled for the Autumn/Winter campaigns by Mango and Hogan. In October 2011, Palermo launched her personal website, which consists of editorial content about fashion, beauty and lifestyle written by full-time writers and contributing editors. She also appeared as a guest judge on Britain and Ireland's Next Top Model Season 7. Later in 2012, the New York Post named Palermo as the best dressed New Yorker of Page Six. Palermo appeared on the August 2018 cover of Glamour Mexico and has shot editorials for magazines, including Grazia Australia and ¡Hola! Fashion Magazine. She was also on the cover of Cosmopolitan, InStyle, Elle, Flare, Marie Claire, Arcadia, Lucky, Brides, Harper's Bazaar, L'Officiel, Tatler and Stella.
Palermo has been the face of mid-range brands such as Aerin, Max&Co, and Banana Republic.

Co-branded partnerships 

In 2010, Palermo launched a co-branded, limited jewelry collection with Roberta Freymann and became the face of the Mediterraneo collection by Spanish jewelry brand Carrera y Carrera. In August 2011, Palermo was invited by Stuart Weitzman to design a shoe for charity. Later in 2014, she designed a line of sunglasses for American brand Westward Leaning, and a percentage of each sale went to support the Association for Development, Alternative Commerce, and Micro Credits's Masaai Project. Also in 2014, Palermo collaborated with Italian shoe label Aquazzura on a line of footwear.

In 2015, Palermo collaborated on collections with luxury leather and accessories brand Aspinal of London, the American jewelry and accessories brand Baublebar, and makeup company Ciaté London. Palermo's collaboration with Ciaté featured a line of makeup and nail polish, including a shade of red inspired by her mother. She went on to partner with Nordstrom on a fashion line in 2016 and with Banana Republic in 2017.
In 2017, Palermo worked with accessory brand Meli Melo on a collection title, Severine. The London brand, known for their high-quality materials and craftsmanship, collaborated with Palermo to create a modern spin on a bucket bag. The bag, which came in five different shades, was modeled after the sculptural works of late architect and artist, Max Bill.

Brand ambassadorships 
Palermo was named the brand ambassador of the 2013 and 2014 Maasai Project for Pikolinos. In September 2016, Banana Republic announced Palermo as the brand's first Women's Global Style Ambassador through 2017.

Personal life 
Palermo married German model Johannes Huebl on June 28, 2014.

Filmography

References

External links

Official website | Olivia Palermo

21st-century American businesspeople
American fashion designers
Fashion influencers
1986 births
Living people
Nightingale-Bamford School alumni